Something to Remind Me is a 2001 German psychological thriller film directed by Christian Petzold.

Cast and characters
 Nina Hoss as Leyla
 André Hennicke as Thomas Richter
 Sven Pippig as Blum
 Heinrich Schmieder as Richard
  as Sophie
  as Ott
 Michael Gerber as Makler
 Franziska Troegner as Peggy
 Johannes Hitzblech as Seifert
  as building superintendent
  as police officer

References

External links
 

German-language television shows
2001 television films
2001 films
German television films
2001 psychological thriller films
German psychological thriller films
Grimme-Preis for fiction winners
2000s German films
ZDF original programming